VSDX Annotator is a software application to view and annotate Microsoft Visio documents on the Apple Mac OS X  operating system. There are some Visio file Viewers or Visio alternatives for creating flowcharts, diagrams, mind-maps, concept-maps and other graphical data. VSDX Annotator is the first application that allows you to comment and annotate MS Visio files on OS X.

Capabilities
VSDX Annotator allows annotating Visio drawings - flowcharts, diagrams, schemes,  and other visual graphic files on a Mac. It makes it possible to view multi-page drawings while displaying shape data, layers, and hyperlinks. The Annotation tab includes 16 tools that can be used to edit files. The Viewing tab contains 12 tools to navigate drawings. VSDX Annotator provides an ability to export modified Visio files in a PDF, send the PDF via email and save VSDX files in the same extension.

See also
Alternative software for Visio on OS X system:
Lucidchart (online tool)
OmniGraffle (application)
ConceptDraw (a suite of applications)

References

External links
Official website
Visio Viewer Mac software
Apple World Today - Notable apps and app updates for Aug. 8, 2016

MacOS software